Oscar Peterson Plays the George Gershwin Songbook is a 1959 album by pianist Oscar Peterson of compositions written by George Gershwin. Peterson had recorded many of the pieces for his 1952 album Oscar Peterson Plays George Gershwin.

Track listing
 "It Ain't Necessarily So" – 2:48
 "The Man I Love" – 3:09
 "Love Walked In" – 2:49
 "I Was Doing All Right" – 2:50
 "A Foggy Day" – 2:55
 "Oh, Lady be Good!" – 3:02
 "Our Love is Here to Stay" – 2:59
 "They All Laughed" – 2:31
 "Let's Call the Whole Thing Off" – 2:20
 "Summertime" (DuBose Heyward) – 2:58
 "Nice Work If You Can Get It" – 2:07
 "Shall We Dance?" – 2:18

All music composed by George Gershwin, with all lyrics by Ira Gershwin. Other lyricists indicated.

Personnel

Performance
Oscar Peterson – piano
Ray Brown – double bass
Ed Thigpen – drums

References

1959 albums
Oscar Peterson albums
Albums produced by Norman Granz
George and Ira Gershwin tribute albums
Verve Records albums